All the Houses Look the Same is the first full-length album by indie rock band Deas Vail. It was released on March 6, 2007, under Brave New World Records.

Track listing
 "Standing..."      
 "Light as Air"
 "Surface"
 "Rewind"
 "Shoreline"
 "A Lover's Charm"
 "Follow Sound"
 "Anything You Say"
 "Shadows and City Lights"
 "For Miles to Come"
 "Life in These Little Boats"
 "This Place is Painted Red"
 "...Still"

References 

2007 albums
Deas Vail albums
Albums produced by Mark Lee Townsend